The preliminary round of the European qualifying for the 2019 FIFA Women's World Cup consisted of the 16 lowest-ranked teams among the 46 entrants.

The 16 teams were drawn into four groups of four teams. Each group was played in single round-robin format, where one of the teams was pre-selected as hosts, between 6 and 11 April 2017. The four group winners and the best runner-up (not counting results against the fourth-placed team) advanced to the qualifying group stage to join the 30 direct entrants.

Kazakhstan, Albania, Israel and the Faroe Islands advanced as group winners, and Moldova advanced as the best runner-up.

Draw
The draw for the preliminary round was held on 19 January 2017, 13:30 CET (UTC+1), at the UEFA headquarters in Nyon, Switzerland.

The 16 teams were allocated into four seeding positions according to their coefficient ranking. They were drawn into four groups of four containing one team from each of the four seeding positions. First, the four teams which were pre-selected as hosts were drawn from their own designated pot and allocated to their respective group as per their seeding positions. Next, the remaining 12 teams were drawn from their respective pot which were allocated according to their seeding positions.

Teams which were pre-selected as preliminary round hosts are denoted by (H).

Groups
The matches were played on 6, 8 and 11 April 2017.

All times were CEST (UTC+2), as listed by UEFA (local times, if different, are in parentheses).

Group 1

Group 2

Group 3

Group 4

Ranking of second-placed teams
To determine the best second-placed teams from the preliminary round which advance to the qualifying group stage, only the results of the second-placed teams against the first and third-placed teams in their group are taken into account, while results against the fourth-placed team are not included. As a result, two matches played by each second-placed team count for the purposes of determining the ranking.

Goalscorers

References

External links
FIFA Women's World Cup Standings: 2017–19 qualifying, UEFA.com

Preliminary round
FIFA Women's World Cup qualification